Scott Michael Sellers (born August 16, 1986) is an American track and field athlete who holds records in the high jump. His clearance of 7-07.75 is currently 4th in NCAA history and 15th in U.S. history. As a high schooler, Sellers broke the national indoor record with a jump of 2.27m in Landover, Maryland. Sellers is currently attending Kansas State University in Manhattan, Kansas.

Sellers won the 2007 Big 12 championships with a jump of 2.33m.  This accomplishment is the fourth highest jump in NCAA history. Sellers followed up his performance by capturing the Midwest Regional title with a jump of 2.25m. Two weeks after winning a Regional title, Sellers became a Division I National Champion when he defeated a very talented field, jumping 2.32m on his second attempt.

In 2009, Sellers won gold in both the NCAA Indoor and Outdoor Championships. These two wins gave Sellers his 7th and 8th All-American honors in the same event, a feat accomplished by a select few in NCAA history.

At the end of 2009 Sellers was named the high school high jump athlete of the decade by ESPN and USAToday.

External links
Kansas State bio
Big 12 spotlight

1986 births
Living people
American male high jumpers
People from Katy, Texas
Sportspeople from Harris County, Texas